Pentafluorobenzoic acid  (PFBA) is an organofluorine compound with the formula C6F5CO2H.  It is a white crystalline powder that has a high solubility in water.  Its pKa of 1.48 indicates that it is a strong acid.

Preparation
Pentafluorobenzoic acid is prepared by treating pentafluorophenyllithium (or pentafluorophenyl Grignard reagent) with carbon dioxide.  These reagents are usually prepared in situ from pentafluorobenzene and bromopentafluorobenzene.

It arises via the reaction of perfluorotoluene with trifluoroacetic acid and antimony pentafluoride.

Substitution reactions
Substitution of fluoride occurs typically at the para position.  This reaction has been used to anchor the −C6F4CO2H group to surfaces.  Magnesium methoxide results in ortho methoxylation.  Cleavage of this ether gives tetrafluorosalicylic acid.  Via similar ortho-directed reactivity, nickel complexes catalyse the defluoridation of 2 and 5 positions.  Without nickel, defluoridation occurs with para-selectivity.

References 

Benzoic acids
Perfluorinated compounds
Pentafluorophenyl compounds